Alvin Ray Jackson (born September 27, 1980) is an American football/arena football linebacker who is currently a free agent.

Early life
Born the son of Alvin and Sherry Jackson, Alvin prepped at North Panola High School in  Sardis, Mississippi, where he was a three-sport athlete, lettering in football, basketball, and track and field. Named All-District twice in football, where he was a cornerback and quarterback. Was a four-year standout in basketball, and was named All-District twice in the 200 meter dash. As a senior, finished fourth in the state in the 200m event. He was on his way to the University of Alabama, when his academics failed to allow him acceptance.

College career
Alvin attended, Northwest Mississippi Community College where he was a wide receiver/punt returner. Had over 45 receptions for 1,100 yards and 12 touchdowns in his lone season with the Rangers.

Alvin then transferred to Jacksonville State University, where he saw limited playing time.

He would ultimately end up at Albany State University, where he would have over 75 receptions, 1,300 receiving yards and 13 touchdowns while also returning punts. Named All-Southern Intercollegiate Athletic Conference Second Team (twice). His best season came as a junior with 37 receptions for 712 yards and seven touchdowns to go along with 30 punt returns for 404 yards and a touchdown. He was also known for 1-for-1 passing as a junior with a 28-yard touchdown pass. Finished his junior season ranked No. 17 in the nation in punt returns with a 13.5 yards/return.

Professional career

South Georgia Wildcats
Signed and played with the South Georgia Wildcats (af2) in 2006 and 2008.

Albany Firebirds
Played for the Albany Firebirds (af2) in 2009. Was an All-AF2 selection at linebacker in 2009.

Arkansas Diamonds
Jackson tried out for the Arkansas Diamonds of the Indoor Football League in 2010, but was later released when he was contacted by the VooDoo.

New Orleans VooDoo
Jackson signed with the New Orleans VooDoo on October 13, 2010. During the 2011 season, he led the team in tackles with 89. In 2012, he earned First-Team All-Arena recognition after setting a single-season franchise record and tied for the AFL-high with 14 interceptions. He also became the VooDoo's all-time leader in tackles with 164 for his career.

Pittsburgh Power
On November 27, 2012, Jackson signed a 3-year contract with the Pittsburgh Power. The move reunited him with his former defensive coordinator, Power head coach Derek Stingley. Jackson was reassigned on September 12, 2013.

Return to the VooDoo
The VooDoo claimed Jackson off reassignment on September 14, 2013. Jackson was placed on reassignment on June 30, 2014.

Jacksonville Sharks
On March 25, 2015, Jackson was assigned to the Jacksonville Sharks.

Cleveland Gladiators
On October 14, 2016, Jackson was selected by the Cleveland Gladiators during the dispersal draft. On March 25, 2017, Jackson was placed on recallable reassignment.

Tampa Bay Storm
On March 28, 2017, Jackson was assigned to the Tampa Bay Storm. He earned First Team All-Arena honors in 2017. The Storm folded in December 2017.

Albany Empire
On March 19, 2018, Jackson was assigned to the Albany Empire. On March 29, 2018, he was placed on recallable reassignment.

Washington Valor
On May 17, 2018, he was assigned to the Washington Valor. On March 12, 2019, Jackson was assigned to the Valor again.

Coaching
During the 2013 season, he coached Fort Valley State University. He was responsible for coaching the wide receivers and kickoff return units. That season the Wildcat football team finished with a 4–6 record.

References

External links

1980 births
Living people
American football linebackers
Albany State Golden Rams football players
South Georgia Wildcats players
Albany Firebirds (af2) players
Arkansas Diamonds players
New Orleans VooDoo players
Pittsburgh Power players
Cleveland Gladiators players
Jacksonville Sharks players
Tampa Bay Storm players
Albany Empire (AFL) players
Washington Valor players
Northwest Mississippi Rangers football players
Players of American football from Mississippi
People from Como, Mississippi
Fort Valley State Wildcats football coaches